Paterno or Paterno Valdagri is a town and comune in the province of Potenza (Basilicata, southern Italy).

References

Cities and towns in Basilicata